Full Circle is the tenth studio album by American country music artist Randy Travis, released in 1996. His last album for Warner Bros. Records until 2008 (not counting his later country-gospel works for Word/Warner/Curb), the album produced four singles: "Are We in Trouble Now", "Would I", "Price to Pay", and a cover of Roger Miller's hit single "King of the Road"; the cover also appeared on the soundtrack to the 1997 film Traveller.

"Are We in Trouble Now" was written by Mark Knopfler. Travis cowrote three of the album's songs.

Critical reception

The Lincoln Journal Star wrote that "when he's on, Travis' lonesome North Carolina baritone slurs and slides with smoothness and feeling that few can match." USA Today thought that "Travis' aching baritone again sounds fresh as rain compared with the river of drivel pouring out of Nashville."

Track listing

Personnel

Mike Brignardello - bass guitar
Robbie Buchanan - piano
Dennis Burnside - keyboards
Larry Byrom - electric guitar, acoustic guitar
Dave Carpenter - upright bass
Mark Casstevens - electric guitar, acoustic guitar
Alvin Chea - background vocals
Cherry Sisters (Lisa Silver, Sherry Huffman, Diane Tidwell) - background vocals
Dan Dugmore - steel guitar, electric guitar
Paul Franklin - steel guitar, Dobro
Steve Gibson - electric guitar
David Hungate - bass guitar
Roy Huskey, Jr. - upright bass
Paul Leim - drums
Chris Leuzinger - electric guitar
Jay Dee Maness - steel guitar
Brent Mason - electric guitar, acoustic guitar
Gene Miller - background vocals
Steve Nathan - keyboards
Dean Parks - acoustic guitar
Hargus "Pig" Robbins - piano
Matt Rollings - piano
John Wesley Ryles - background vocals
Mike Shapiro - drums
Hank Singer - fiddle
Milton Sledge - drums
Randy Travis - acoustic guitar, lead vocals
Billy Joe Walker, Jr. - electric guitar, acoustic guitar
Mervyn Warren - background vocals
Dennis Wilson - background vocals
Curtis Wright - background vocals
Curtis Young - background vocals

Chart performance

References

1996 albums
Randy Travis albums
Warner Records albums
Albums produced by Kyle Lehning